The  was a Byzantine court post, responsible for the imperial banquets.

History
Historical sources, however, show that some holders of the post were entrusted with leading troops or various other special assignments. Like many palace posts involving close access to the Byzantine emperor, it was restricted to eunuchs.

In this vein, Nikephoros Gregoras reports that this dignity was allegedly conferred and made hereditary to the princes of Russia from the time of Emperor Constantine the Great on.

References

Sources
 
 

Byzantine court titles
Byzantine palace offices
Byzantine titles and offices reserved for eunuchs
Ceremonial occupations